Turó de la Mamella is a mountain of Catalonia, Spain.

This mountain is part of the Llorenç del Munt and L'Obac Natural Park.

See also
Mountains of Catalonia
Breast-shaped hill

References

External links
 Parc Natural de Sant Llorenç del Munt i l'Obac

Mountains of Catalonia
Vallès Occidental